Khadim may refer to:

People
 Khadim Faye (born 1970), Senegalese footballer
 Khadim Hussain (1905–1972), Pakistani cricket player and umpire
 Khadim Hussain Khan (1907–1993), Indian singer
 Khadim Hussain Raja (1922–1999), Pakistani army officer
 Khadim Hussain Rizvi, Pakistani Muslim scholar and politician.
 Khadim N'Diaye (born 1984), Senegalese footballer

Others
 Khadim, an alternative spelling of the Khadem caste, a Muslim community in Rajasthan, India

 Khadim, an Arabic word (خادم) meaning "Servant", also used in Persian and Urdu